Gavatamak (also Romanized as Gavātāmak) is a village in Kahnuk Rural District, Irandegan District, Khash County, Sistan and Baluchestan Province, Iran. At the 2006 census, its population was 20, in 5 families.

References 

Populated places in Khash County